Level Creek is a stream in Gwinnett County in the U.S. state of Georgia. It is a tributary to the Chattahoochee River.

Level Creek was so named on account of the relatively level terrain along its course.

References

Rivers of Georgia (U.S. state)
Rivers of Gwinnett County, Georgia